Cahal Carvill (born 22 April 1987) is a hurler who plays as a centre-forward at senior level for the Armagh county team.

Carvill made his debut on the inter-county scene as a dual player for the Armagh minor teams. He played for several seasons in this grade, and won an Ulster Minor Football Championship medal as a Gaelic footballer, coming on as a late substitute in both the semi-final and final, and an All-Ireland medal as a hurler in the C competition. Carvill subsequently joined the Armagh under-21 hurling and football teams, winning an All-Ireland hurling medal at C level. By this stage he had also joined the Armagh senior hurling team, making his debut in 2006, and going on to win two Nicky Rackard Cup medals (the fourth-highest senior inter-county championship overall in hurling) and two lower National Hurling League medals.

Honours
Queen's University Belfast
Sigerson Cup (1): 2007

Middleton Na Fianna
Ulster Intermediate Club Hurling Championship (2): 2011, 2017
Armagh Senior Hurling Championship (10): 2006, 2009, 2011, 2012, 2015, 2016, 2017, 2019, 2020, 2021

Armagh
Nicky Rackard Cup (2): 2010, 2012
National Hurling League Division 2B (1): 2016 (c)
National Hurling League Division 3 (1): 2006
Ulster Minor Football Championship (1): 2005

Awards
Christy Ring Cup Champions 15 (1): 2011

References

1987 births
Living people
Middletown Na Fianna hurlers
Armagh Gaelic footballers
Armagh inter-county hurlers
Ulster inter-provincial hurlers

https://en.m.wikipedia.org/wiki/Nicky_Rackard_Cup